Hibbertia notibractea is a species of flowering plant in the family Dilleniaceae and is endemic to the south-west of Western Australia. It is an erect, sprawling or prostrate shrub with linear to narrow elliptic leaves and yellow flowers with eleven stamens, nine in groups of three, arranged around three glabrous carpels.

Description
There are eleven stamens, nine in groups of three, arranged all around the three glabrous carpels that each contain a single ovule. Flowering occurs from September to November.

Taxonomy
Hibbertia notibractea was first formally described in 2002 by Judith R. Wheeler in the journal Nuytsia from specimens she collected near Molloy Island in 1983. The specific epithet (notibractea) refers to the large, conspicuous bracts around the flowers.

Distribution and habitat
This hibbertia grows in woodland around swamps or seasonally wet places between the Leeuwin-Naturaliste National Park and Denmark in the Jarrah Forest and Warren biogeographic regions of south-western Western Australia.

Conservation status
Hibbertia notibractea is classified as "not threatened" by the Western Australian Government Department of Parks and Wildlife.

See also
List of Hibbertia species

References

notibractea
Flora of Western Australia
Plants described in 2002